William Henry Schroeder (April 11, 1923 – December 9, 2003) was an American professional two-sport athlete, playing both football and basketball during the 1940s.

A two-sport standout for the University of Wisconsin–Madison, Schroeder then played two seasons in the All-America Football Conference for the Chicago Rockets (1946, 1947) after serving in World War II. He played in 26 career games.  On the hardwood, Schroeder competed in the National Basketball League for the Sheboygan Red Skins during the 1946–47 season and averaged 1.7 points per game. After his professional sports careers ended, Schroeder worked as an insurance salesman.

References

1923 births
2003 deaths
American football halfbacks
United States Marine Corps personnel of World War II
American men's basketball players
Basketball players from Wisconsin
Chicago Rockets players
Forwards (basketball)
Guards (basketball)
Players of American football from Wisconsin
Sheboygan Red Skins players
Sportspeople from Sheboygan, Wisconsin
Wisconsin Badgers football players
Wisconsin Badgers men's basketball players